Éric Allibert (born June 11, 1976 in Vaison-la-Romaine, France) is a  footballer currently playing for USL Dunkerque. He plays as a goalkeeper.

References

External links
Eric Allibert profile at chamoisfc79.fr

1976 births
Living people
French footballers
Association football goalkeepers
Nîmes Olympique players
Lille OSC players
Chamois Niortais F.C. players
FC Rouen players
Ligue 1 players
Ligue 2 players